Georges Montalba was the pseudonym used by pipe organist Robert Hunter (April 14, 1929 – September 10, 2001), a resident of Glendale, California, United States. In 1958, Hunter/Montalba recorded Pipe Organ Favorites & Fantasy in Pipe Organ and Percussion at the Lorin Whitney Studios for Somerset Stereo-Fidelity Records. Both albums were later reissued on CD on the Hit Thing label. Robert Hunter later went on to work with George Burns and Carol Channing on Broadway.

References

 
 
  

1929 births
2001 deaths
American classical organists
20th-century organists
20th-century classical musicians